AEK Athens F.C. is one of the greatest and most historical association football clubs in Greece. They have a long, unique and idiosyncratic history and has experienced both the highs and lows of the game. They won their first championship in 1939 and has gone on to become one of Greece's most successful football teams.

Origins

The large Greek population of Constantinople, not unlike those of the other Ottoman urban centres, continued its athletic traditions in the form of numerous athletic clubs. Clubs such as Énosis Tataoúlon and Iraklís from the Tatavla district, Mégas Aléxandros and Ermís of Galata and Olympiás of Therapia existed to promote the Hellenic athletic and cultural ideals. These were amongst a dozen Greek-backed clubs that dominated the sporting landscape of the city in the years preceding World War I. After the war, with the influx of mainly French and English soldiers to Constantinople, many of the city clubs participated in regular competition with teams formed by the foreign troops. Taxim, Pera and Tatavla became the scene of weekly competitions in not only football, but also athletics, cycling, boxing and tennis.

Of the clubs in the city, association football was dominated by Énosis Tataoúlon and The Greek Football Team. In 1914, The Greek Football Team was formed as the football department of Ermís, a sports club established in 1875 by the Greek community of Pera (Galata). Known as "Pera" since the mid-1880s, it was forced to change its name to "Pera Sports Club" and then "Beyoğluspor Kulübü" in 1923. Many of its athletes and those of most other Greek sporting clubs, fled during the Greek genocide and the population exchanges at the end of the Greco-Turkish War and settled in Athens and Thessaloniki.

The early years (1924–1959)

Formation and first steps (1924–1929)

Honours Won: —

Runner-up: Athens Championship: 3 (1925, 1927, 1929)

In 1924, the founders of AEK – a group of Constantinopolitan refugees (among them former athletes from the Pera Sports Club and the other Constantinopolitan clubs) – met at the athletic shop "Lux" of Emilios Ionas and Konstantinos Dimopoulos on Veranzerou Street, in the center of Athens and created AEK. Their intention was to create a club that provided athletic and cultural diversions for the thousands of predominantly Constantinopolitan and Anatolian refugees who had settled in the new suburbs of Athens (including Nea Filadelfeia, Nea Ionia, Nea Chalkidona, Nea Smyrni).

AEK's first game was a 1–1 friendly draw against Atromitos in October 1924. Their first official match was a 4–2 win against Goudi on 14 December 1924.

AEK's football team grew rapidly in popularity during the 1920s, eclipsing the already-established Athens-based refugee clubs (Panionios, Apollon Smyrnis), thanks mainly to the large pool of immigrants that were drawn to the club and due, in no small part, to the political connections and wealth of several of the club's board members. Not possessing a football ground, AEK played most of its early matches at various locations around Athens, including the grounds of the Temple of Olympian Zeus and the Leoforos Alexandras Stadium.

AEK's first president, Konstantinos Spanoudis (1871–1941), a journalist and associate of the then Greek Prime Minister Eleftherios Venizelos, petitioned the government to set aside land for the establishment of a sports ground. In 1926, land in Nea Filadelfia that was originally set aside for refugee housing was donated as a training ground for the refugees. AEK began using the ground for training (albeit unofficially) and by 1930 the property was signed over to the club.

In 1927 Panathinaikos, Olympiacos and AEK decided to break away from the Athens regional league after a dispute with the fledgling Hellenic Football Federation (EPO). They formed an alliance called P.O.K. (acronym for Podosfairikes Omades Kentrou) and started organising friendly matches against each other and several continental European clubs. This also marked the start of the so-called Easter Cup. In 1928, though, the dispute ended and AEK, along with the other P.O.K. clubs, entered the EPO fold once again.

In 1928, Venizelos approved the plans to build what was to become AEK's home ground for the next 70 years, the Nikos Goumas Stadium.

Moving to home ground and first successes (1929–1940)

Honours Won: Greek Cup: 2 (1931–32, 1938–39), Easter Cup: 1 (1938), Panhellenic Championship: 2 (1938–39, 1939–40), Athens Championship: 1 (1940)

Runner-up: Athens Championship: 5 (1930, 1931, 1937, 1938, 1939)

In 1930 the Nikos Goumas Stadium was completed. The area where the stadium was located had been previously used as the training ground of the club. The first home game, in November 1930, was an exhibition match against Olympiacos that ended in a 2–2 draw.

In 1932, AEK won the inaugural Greek Cup, beating Aris 5–3 in the final. The goals for AEK were scored by Ilias Iliaskos, Nikos Baltas (twice), Oikonomou (O.G.) and Kostas Negrepontis, a veteran of the original Pera Club of Constantinople. This was also the first ever title won by the club.

In 1933, former star striker, Kostas Negrepontis took over the managerial guidance of AEK. He managed to build a formidable team which was led by Kleanthis Maropoulos and Tryfon Tzanetis, the best pair of forwards at the time and one of the best in Greek football's history. Other important players included Michalis Delavinias, Georgios Magiras and Spyros Sklavounos.

The club's success during the late 1930's was highlighted by the Panhellenic Championships in 1939 and 1940. The 2–1 win in the 1939 cup final, goals by Alekos Chatzistavridis and Vasilios Manettas, marked the first ever double (domestic Championship and Cup) in the history of Greek football.

During World War II (1940–1945)

Honours Won: Christmas Cup: 1 (1943) Easter Cup: 1 (1944)

Runner-up: —

The 1940–41 Panhellenic Championship was interrupted due to the Greco-Italian War (1940–1941). After the Battle of Greece (1941) and during the Axis occupation of Greece (1941–1945) sporting events were scarce.

During the Greco-Italian War in a battle at Pogradec, AEK player K. Vavanis was badly injured by a mortar bomb that exploded in front of him.
During the spring of 1942 Panathinaikos and AEK were to give a friendly match to raise money for a hospital but were asked to give part of the revenue to the occupation forces. Tasos Kritikos and Kleanthis Maropoulos, who served as captains of the two clubs, refused and the 15,000 spectators turned into one of the largest protests of the time. The game is now known as the "Resistance Derby". In June 1944 AEK player Spyros Kontoulis was killed by the Nazi forces during his attempt to escape while being transported to Kaisariani in order to be executed for being part of the resistance.

The 1942–43 Panhellenic Championship was an attempt to restart sporting activity but was not completed.

The Post-World War II years (1945–1952)

Honours Won: Athens Championship: 3 (1946, 1947, 1950), Christmas Cup: 1 (1947), Greek Cup: 2 (1949, 1950)

Runner-up: Panhellenic Championship: 1 (1946), Greek Cup: 1 (1948), Athens Championship: 2 (1951, 1952)

With English coach Jack Beby at the wheel, veteran players such as Maropoulos, Tzanetis, Delavinias and Magiras, along with new generation players such as Kostas Poulis, Goulios and Pavlos Emmanouilidis, AEK won the Greek Cup of 1949 and 1950, beating Panathinaikos by 2–1 and Aris by 4–0.

AEK won also the Athens regional championship of 1950, but the play–off games for the Panhellenic Championship were not played, due to many players being called up for a prolonged training camp for the national team.

A new generation of stars (1952–1959)

Honours Won: Christmas Cup: 1 (1957), Greek Cup: 1 (1956), Easter Cup: 2 (1955, 1958)

Runner-up: Panhellenic Championship: 2 (1958, 1959), Greek Cup: 1 (1953), Athens Championship: 2 (1954, 1958)

The early 1950's saw the addition of the next generation of star footballers in Giannis Kanakis, Andreas Stamatiadis and goalkeeper Stelios Serafidis and along with Poulis and Emmanouilidis.

In 1955 AEK signed Kostas Nestoridis, a player who would become the greatest forward of his era. His former team Panionios did not consent with the transfer, so Nestoridis was forced to sit out both the 1955–56 and the 1956–57 seasons due to the restraining law which applied at the time.

AEK won the Greek Cup title of 1956, this time beating Olympiacos by 2–1 in the final.

The early Alpha Ethniki years (1959–1974)

The Harry Aurednik Era (1959–1961)

Honours Won: —

Runner-up: Alpha Ethniki: 1 (1960)

From 1958–59 up to 1962–63, Kostas Nestoridis constantly finished top goal scorer in the league four consecutive times and was generally considered to be the best Greek player of his time.

1959–1960 season

1960–1961 season, Part I

The Tryfon Tzanetis Era, Part IV (1961–1962)

Honours Won: —

Runner-up: —

1960–1961 season, Part II

1961–1962 season

The Jenő Csaknády Era, Part I (1962–1963)

Honours Won: Alpha Ethniki: 1 (1963)

Runner-up: —

Nevertheless, Nestoridis' performances alone were not enough for AEK to win any titles. It was not until young striker Mimis Papaioannou was signed that AEK managed to rise to the top. Forming a formidable duo of forward with Nestoridis, who was the league's top score a record fifth consecutive time, he helped AEK win the 1962–63 Championship by scoring twice in the play–off against Panathinaikos, levelling the scores at 3–3 and giving AEK its first post-war championship title on goal aggregate. Coached by Jenő Csaknady, the championship team also consisted of veterans Stelios Serafidis and Andreas Stamatiadis, Alekos Sofianidis, Stelios Skevofilakas, Giorgos Petridis, Manolis Kanellopoulos, Miltos Papapostolou and the Syrian Ibrahim Mughrabi, the first foreign player to play for AEK.

1962–1963 season

The Heinrich Müller Era (1963–1964)

Honours Won: Greek Cup: 1 (1964)

Runner-up: —

1963–1964 season

The Mirko Kokotović Era (1964–1965)

Honours Won: —

Runner-up: Alpha Ethniki: 1 (1965)

Fenerbahçe and Turkey legend Lefter Küçükandonyadis, who was of Greek descent, joined AEK in 1964. He played five matches and scored two goals for the Greek side before closing his glorious career.

1964–1965 season

The Tryfon Tzanetis Era, Part V (1965–1966)

Honours Won: Greek Cup: 1 (1966)

Runner-up: —

1965–1966 season

1966–1967 season, Part I

The Jenő Csaknády Era, Part II (1967–1968)

Honours Won: Alpha Ethniki: 1 (1968)

Runner-up: Alpha Ethniki: 1 (1967)

With the return of Csaknády to the coach's position in 1967 and with some great players in Kostas Nikolaidis, Giorgos Karafeskos, Panagiotis Ventouris, Fotis Balopoulos, Spyros Pomonis, Aleko Yordan and Nikos Stathopoulos, AEK won the championship with relative ease.

1966–1967 season, Part II

1967–1968 season

The Branko Stanković Era (1968–1973)

Honours Won: Alpha Ethniki: 1 (1971)

Runner-up: Alpha Ethniki: 1 (1970)

The additions of experienced forward Andreas Papaemmanouil and young defender Apostolos Toskas in 1969 reinforced the team and allowed AEK to win their fifth league title in 1971 and became the first Greek football club to reach the quarter-finals of European Cup.

AEK also won the unofficial Supercup of 1971 beating Olympiacos 4–2 on penalty kicks after two draws, 2–2 at Piraeus and 1–1 at Nea Filadelfia.

1968–1969 season

1969–1970 season

1970–1971 season

1971–1972 season

1972–1973 season, Part I

Overview

The Billy Bingham Era (1973)

Honours Won: —

Runner-up: —

1972–73 season, Part II

The Stan Anderson Era (1973–1974)

Honours Won: —

Runner-up: —

1973–74 season

The Barlos ownership years (1974–1981)

The František Fadrhonc Era (1974–1977)

Honours Won: —

Runner-up: Alpha Ethniki: 2 (1975, 1976)

1974–75 season

New chairman Loukas Barlos hired František Fadrhonc, the man who had just led the Netherlands to the finals of the 1974 FIFA World Cup, as AEK's manager.

Summer arrivals included German players Walter Wagner and Timo Zahnleiter plus the Greeks Christos Ardizoglou and Giorgos Dedes.

AEK finished second in Alpha Ethniki and qualified for the UEFA Cup.

1975–76 season

Giorgos Dedes won the top scorer award in the Alpha Ethniki helping AEK finish second for the second consecutive season.

1976–77 season

Summer arrivals included Thomas Mavros, Nikos Christidis, Petros Ravousis and Takis Nikoloudis.

The club's most memorable moment in European competitions was the campaign to the semi-final of the UEFA Cup during the 1976–77 season under František Fadrhonc's management. In the way to the semi-final AEK Athens managed to eliminate four clubs. In the first round they faced Soviet champions Dynamo Moscow. In Athens won 2–0 with goals by Takis Nikoloudis and Mimis Papaioannou. In Moscow, Dynamo paid them back by winning 2–0 and leading the match to extra time. In the last minute of extra time, AEK Athens managed to score thanks to a penalty kick by Tasos Konstantinou and proceeded to the second round. They were drawn against English 4th placed side Derby County. In Athens a goal by Walter Wagner and an own goal by Rod Thomas gave AEK the 2–0 win. In Derby AEK Athens found themselves behind in the score line but responded scoring three times with Takis Nikoloudis, Tasos Konstantinou and Walter Wagner. Derby Country only managed to score a consolation goal and the match ended in a 2–3 win for AEK Athens. In the third round AEK Athens had to oppose Yugoslav giants Red Star Belgrade. In Athens AEK was once again victorious by winning 2–0. Mimis Papaioannou and Thomas Mavros were the goal-scorers. In Belgrade Red Star took the lead with a goal by Petar Baralić but Walter Wagner quickly equalised. The two additional goals scored by Zoran Filipović and Dušan Savić were not enough and AEK Athens won on away goals. In the quarter-final AEK Athens faced their greatest challenge to that moment, English league's runner-up side QPR. The first leg was played in London. The two penalty kick goals in the first ten minutes scored by Gerry Francis and another one scored by Stan Bowles gave QPR the 3–0 win and what looked like a certain qualification. Nevertheless, AEK Athens made the impossible possible. With two goals by Thomas Mavros and ano more by Mimis Papaioannou AEK Athens sent the match to extra time and eventually to a penalty shootout. Three minutes before the final whistle, František Fadrhonc had Nikos Christidis substitute Lakis Stergioudas, the team's regular goalkeeper. His move proved vital as Nikos Christidis saved two penalties and gave AEK Athens a 7–6 win. In the semi-finals draw AEK Athens were to play either Italian league's runner-up side Juventus or Spanish league's third placed side Athletic Bilbao. Ultimately AEK Athens had to face the Italians. In Turin, Juventus scored first with Antonello Cuccureddu but AEK Athens responded with a goal by Lazaros Papadopoulos. Two goals by Roberto Bettega and one by Franco Causio followed, giving Juventus a 4–1 victory. Juventus also won in Nikos Goumas Stadium thanks to a goal scored by Roberto Boninsegna end went on to win their first European title.

1977–78 season, Part I

Important forwards Walter Wagner and Giorgos Dedes both left the club but club chairman Loukas Barlos replaced them with Yugoslav international Dušan Bajević who was considered to be one of the best forwards of his time. Unfortunately, Bajević suffered an injury with prevented him from playing during the first matches of the 1977–78 season.

Overview

The Zlatko Čajkovski Era, Part I (1977–1978)

Honours Won: Alpha Ethniki: 1 (1978), Greek Cup: 1 (1978)

Runner-up: —

1977–78 season, Part II

Dušan Bajević and Thomas Mavros formed one of the most fearsome forward duos in the history of Greek football. Bajević's height and technique perfectly completed Mavros' speed and goalscoring ability.

Under Zlatko Čajkovski AEK Athens played impressive football and achieved the domestic double in one of the most successful seasons in the club's history.

The Ferenc Puskás Era (1978–1979)

Honours Won: —

Runner-up: —

1978–79 season, Part I

Ferenc Puskás was appointed as AEK's manager. The most important addition to the AEK Athens roster was the one of former Panathinaikos star Mimis Domazos.

In the 1978–79 European Cup AEK Athens achieved the most impressive win in their history beating Portuguese champions Porto 6–1. The six goals were scored by Dušan Bajević (x2), Christos Ardizoglou, Tasos, Lakis Nikolaou and Thomas Mavros.

Nevertheless, Loukas Barlos was not satisfied with Puskás and decided to replace him.

The Andreas Stamatiadis Era (1979)

Honours Won: Alpha Ethniki: 1 (1979)

Runner-up: Greek Cup: 1 (1979)

1978–79 season, Part II

Former AEK star Andreas Stamatiadis was appointed as manager. With him coaching, AEK won the Alpha Ethniki (second consecutive) and reached the final of the Greek Cup.

At the end of the season AEK legend Mimis Papaioannou decided to leave the clubs after 17 seasons. During his service he became the club's top player in terms of both league goals (surpassing former teammate Kostas Nestoridis) and league appearances. His records have yet to be broken.

The Hermann Stessl Era (1979–1980)

Honours Won: —

Runner-up: —

1979–80 season, Part I

From this season and on, football in Greece became professional. Chairman Loukas Barlos became AEK's first owner.

Mimis Domazos left during the season to close his career with Panathinaikos. Young Stelios Manolas made his debut on 3 February 1980. Dušan Bajević was the league's top scorer.

The Miltos Papapostolou Era (1980–1981)

Honours Won: —

Runner-up: Alpha Ethniki: 1 (1981)

1979–80 season, Part II

1980–81 season

A next generation of star players were produced by AEK Athens' Academy and made their debut during this period including Spyros Oikonomopoulos, Vangelis Vlachos and Lysandros Georgamlis.

The post-Barlos sterile years (1981–1988)

The Hans Tilkowski Era (1981–1982)

Honours Won: —

Runner-up: —

1981–82 season, Part I

The Zlatko Čajkovski Era, Part II (1982–1983)

Honours Won: –

Runner-up: —

1981–82 season, Part II

1982–83 season, Part I

The Helmut Senekowitsch Era, Part I (1983)

Honours Won: Greek Cup: 1 (1983)

Runner-up: —

With new president Michalis Arkadis and Austrian head coach Helmut Senekowitsch, AEK won the 1983 Greek Cup, beating PAOK 2–0 in the newly built Athens Olympic Stadium. Thomas Mavros and 21-year-old captain Vangelis Vlachos were the goalscorers.

1982–83 season, Part II

The John Barnwell Era (1983)

Honours Won: —

Runner-up: —

1983–84 season, Part I

The Helmut Senekowitsch Era, Part II (1983–1984)

Honours Won: –

Runner-up: —

1983–84 season, Part II

The Václav Halama Era (1984)

Honours Won: —

Runner-up: —

1984–85 season, Part I

The Antonis Georgiadis Era (1984–1985)

Honours Won: —

Runner-up: —

1984–85 season, Part II

The Jacek Gmoch Era (1985–1986)

Honours Won: —

Runner-up: —

1985–86 season

Summer arrivals included Australian international Jim Patikas.

Overview

Under Gmoch's management the club played a total of 41 matches winning 19 of them and drawing in 12 more. They scored a total of 65 goals while conceding 40.

The Ab Fafié Era (1986)

Honours Won: —

Runner-up: —

1986–87 season, Part I

The Nikos Alefantos Era (1986–1987)

Honours Won: —

Runner-up: —

1986–87 season, Part II

The Todor Veselinović Era (1987–1988)

Honours Won: —

Runner-up: Alpha Ethniki (1988)

1987–88 season

Summer arrivals included Henrik Nielsen and Cypriot international Giorgos Savvidis.

Golden Years (1988–1997)

The Dušan Bajević Era, Part I (1988–1996)

Honours Won: Alpha Ethniki: 4 (1989, 1992, 1993, 1994), Greek Super Cup: 1 (1989), Greek League Cup: 1 (1990), Greek Cup: 1 (1996)

Runner-up: Alpha Ethniki: 2 (1990, 1996), Greek Super Cup: 3 (1992, 1993, 1994), Greek Cup: 2 (1994, 1995)

1988–89 season

AEK Athens chased the elusive Championship title and it finally came in 1989. Coached by former star player Dušan Bajević, AEK Athens clinched the title after a winning a crucial match 1–0 against Olympiacos at the Athens Olympic Stadium. Takis Karagiozopoulos scored the goal that gave AEK its first Championship in a decade.

1989–90 season

Summer arrivals included Daniel Batista.

AEK Athens also won the Greek Super-Cup of 1989, beating Panathinaikos on penalties, (normal time 1–1). AEK also won the Greek League Cup of 1990 (beating Olympiakos 3–2).

1990–91 season

Summer arrivals included Vaios Karagiannis.

1991–92 season

Summer arrivals included Greek international Vasilis Dimitriadis, Yugoslav international Refik Šabanadžović, Zoran Slišković and Alexis Alexandris.

1992–93 season

Summer arrivals included Greek internationals Tasos Mitropoulos and Giorgos Agorogiannis, Charis Kopitsis and Ilias Atmatsidis. Vasilis Tsartas joined the roster during the winter transfer period.

The departure of star player Daniel Batista for rival Olympiacos did not affect AEK's performance as they won the Alpha Ethniki with Vasilis Dimitriadis being the league's top scorer.

AEK Athens also qualified in the Last 16 of the newly founded UEFA Champions League where they were eliminated by Dutch champions PSV (1–0 in Athens, 0–3 in Eindhoven).

1993–94 season

Summer arrivals included Greek international Michalis Vlachos and Michalis Kasapis.

AEK went on to win the Greek league a third consecutive year, a record for the club.

They also reached the final of the Greek Cup.

1994–95 season

Summer arrivals included Greek internationals Dimitris Saravakos and Christos Kostis, Georgian international Temur Ketsbaia and Nikos Kostenoglou. Alekos Alexandris departed for rival side Olympiacos.

In 1994–1995 AEK became the first Greek football club that participated in the group stage of the UEFA Champions League after eliminating Scottish champions Rangers by beating them twice. AEK Athens was eliminated in the group stage by Dutch champions Ajax and Italian champions Milan, who both made it to the final.  The fourth club of the group was Casino Salzburg.

In the Alpha Ethniki AEK Athens had one of the least successful seasons in its history finishing in the fifth position, 21 points behind champions Panathinaikos.

1995–96 season

With Michalis Trochanas as president and Dušan Bajević as coach, the club won the Greek Cup.

Although Bajević had been stating throughout the season that he would renew his contract if the club managed to win the Greek Cup he decided to turn the offer down for a more lucrative deal with Olympiacos.

Overview

Under Bajević's management the club performed what was to be called Greek total football, a true Golden Era for AEK Athens.

The Petros Ravousis Era (1996–1997)

Honours Won: Greek Super Cup (1996), Greek Cup (1997)

Runner-up: Alpha Ethniki (1997)

1996–97 season

The 1996 summer transfer period was marked by Demis Nikolaidis' decision to decline the more lucrative offer from Olympiacos and join AEK Athens, his favourite team since childhood. Former player Petros Ravousis took over the coaching position when Dušan Bajević defected to Piraeus-based rivals Olympiacos at the end of 1996 and led the team to its second Super-Cup (August 1996), beating Panathinaikos on penalties and to its eleventh Cup title in 1997, again beating Panathinaikos on penalties.

AEK Athens also reached the 1996–97 UEFA Cup Winners' Cup quarter-finals where they lost to Paris Saint-Germain.

ENIC ownership years (1997–2004)

The Dumitru Dumitriu Era (1997–1998)

Honours Won: —

Runner-up: —

1997–98 season

AEK Athens also reached the 1997–98 UEFA Cup Winners' Cup quarter-finals (for the second consecutive season) where they lost to Lokomotiv Moscow due to a last minute goal.

Overview

Under Dumitriu's management the club played a total of 36 matches winning 22 of them and drawing in 7 more. They scored a total of 62 goals while conceding 32.

The Dragoslav Stepanović Era (1998)

Honours Won: —

Runner-up: —

1998–99 season, Part I

Overview

Under Stepanović's management the club played a total of 11 matches winning 6 of them and drawing in 3 more. They scored a total of 22 goals while conceding 14.

The Oleg Blokhin Era (1998–1999)

Honours Won: —

Runner-up: Alpha Ethniki (1999)

1998–99 season, Part II

In the Alpha Ethniki AEK Athens secured the second place and an UEFA Champions League third qualifying round ticket.

In the UEFA Cup AEK Athens was beaten by Dutch third placed side Vitesse.

Overview

Under Blokhin's management the club played a total of 24 matches winning 16 of them and drawing in 4 more. They scored a total of 52 goals while conceding 19.

The Ljubiša Tumbaković Era (1999–2000)

Honours Won: —

Runner-up: —

1999–00 season, Part I

In 1999, ex-president Dimitris Melissanidis organised a friendly match against FK Partizan, in Belgrade, during the height of the NATO bombing of Serbia. As a gesture of compassion and solidarity towards the embattled Serbs, the AEK players and management staff defied the international embargo and traveled to Belgrade for the match. The game ended 1–1, when after 60 minutes of play thousands of Serbian football fans invaded the pitch to embrace the footballers.

The Giannis Pathiakakis Era (2000–2001)

Honours Won: Greek Cup (2000)

Runner-up: —

1999–00 season, Part II

Giannis Pathiakakis replaced Takis Karagiozopoulos in the middle of the 1999–00 season but failed to achieve more than the third place in the league, yet won its twelfth Cup title by defeating Ionikos 3–0 in the final. The tree goals were scored by club icon Demis Nikolaidis, Milen Petkov and Christos Maladenis. Nikolaidis was later given an award by FIFA’s Fair Play committee after informing the referee that one of the goals he scored during the match was a handball.

2000–01 season, Part I

During the 2000 summer transfer period AEK Athens signed Greek internationals Vasilios Tsiartas and Theodoros Zagorakis who alongside Argentine Fernando Navas who joined from Boca Juniors were meant to give them the edge to win the Greek league.

In the UEFA Cup AEK Athens easily overcame Hungarian third placed side Vasas and Danish champions Herfølge and were drawn against German runner-up side Bayer Leverkusen. AEK Athens secured a 4–4 away draw thanks to goals by Vasilios Lakis, Fernando Navas (2) and Vasilis Tsartas. In Athens AEK won 2–0, goals by Navas and Tsartas and progressed to the Fourth round.

In the Greek Cup second round AEK Athens was drawn against Olympiacos. In the first leg and while the score was 1–1, AEK Athens fans were ready to enter the field because of referee Pontikis constantly favouring Olympiacos when AEK Athens chairman Petros Stathis instructed the players to fake injuries so that the match would stop. Olympiacos won 0–2 without a match.

Overview

Under Pathiakakis' management the club generally perform well. They played a total of 59 matches winning 37 of them and drawing in 10 more. They scored a total of 143 goals conceding 70.

The Toni Savevski Era (2001)

Honours Won: —

Runner-up: —

2000–01 season, Part II

Toni Savevski replaced Giannis Pathiakakis in the middle of the 2000–01 season but failed to achieve more than the third place in the league.

In the UEFA Cup fourth round AEK Athens was eliminated by Spanish runner-up side Barcelona.

Overview
Under Savevski's management the club generally performed well. They played a total of 17 matches winning 11 of them and drawing in 1 more. They scored a total of 32 goals conceding 18.

The Fernando Santos Era, Part I (2001–2002)

Honours Won: Greek Cup (2002)

Runner-up: Alpha Ethniki (2002)

2001–02 season

New chairman Makis Psomiadis managed to hire Fernando Santos as the new head coach. Summer transfers included the signing of Paraguayan international centre back Gamarra and Polish international striker Grzegorz Mielcarski.

The club performed well in all competitions and managed to be in the first position during the Christmas holidays. In the winter transfer season AEK Athens signed António Folha and Ilija Ivić to further strengthen its squad. Traianos Dellas left the club during the winter transfer period. The club continued its consistency in the 2001–02 Alpha Ethniki but a lack of form resulted it three straight losses that allowed Olympiacos to cover the lost ground. Ultimately AEK Athens finished equal-first with Olympiacos, however the Piraeus club had a better goal thus prevented AEK Athens from winning their twelfth title.

However they did win their thirteenth Greek Cup achieving a 0–4 away victory against PAOK and defeating Olympiacos 2–1 in the final. Sotiris Konstantinidis gave AEK Athens the lead but Giovanni equalised for Olympiacos. Golden sub Ilija Ivić scored AEK Athens' winning goal a minute after he entered the pitch.

In the 2001–02 UEFA Cup AEK Athens reached the fourth round (last 16) eliminating Luxembourgian runner-up side Grevenmacher, Scottish third placed side Hibernian, Croatian runner-up side Osijek and Bulgarian fourth placed side Litex Lovech in the process. Now they would face Italian fifth placed side Inter Milan. In Stadio Giuseppe Meazza although AEK Athens managed to score an early away goal, thanks to a long shot by Thodoris Zagorakis, they did not manage to overpower Inter Milan who reversed the scoreline winning 3–1 thanks to goals by Javier Zanetti, Mohamed Kallon and Nicola Ventola. In Nikos Goumas Stadium Inter scored first with Vratislav Greško but AEK Athens took the lead with goals by Sotiris Konstantinidis and Demis Nikolaidis. Ventola equalised and the match ended in a 2–2 draw preventing AEK from further progressing into the competition.

The Dušan Bajević Era, Part II (2002–2004)

Honours Won: —

Runner-up: —

2002–03 season

AEK Athens chairman Makis Psomiadis replaced popular head coach Fernando Santos with former AEK Athens legend Dušan Bajević. This decision was not received well by hardcore fans Original 21 who protested because they considered his move to rivals Olympiacos six year ago as high treason. Despite the open hostility towards Bajevic the signings of Vasilios Borbokis and Grigoris Georgatos spread optimism for a successful season.

AEK Athens' unbeaten run in the UEFA Champions League was the highlight of the season. The club played against Cypriot champions APOEL in the third qualifying round. In the first leg in Nicosia APOEL scored first with Marinos Ouzounidis but AEK Athens managed to take the lead with Vasilios Borbokis scoring twice. A late equaliser by Costas Malekkos did not prove enough for APOEL as Demis Nikolaidis scored during stoppage time giving his club the win. In Athens AEK Athens won thanks to a header by Mauricio Wright and entered the group stage where they were drawn against Belgian champions Racing Genk, Italian runner-up side Roma and UEFA Champions League's holders Real Madrid. AEK Athens secured two goalless draws against Racing Genk in Genk and Roma in Athens before confronting Real Madrid. Defending champions Madrid drew 3–3 with AEK, but were twice behind against the Greek side. Vasilis Tsiartas became the first player to score against the Spanish side in this season's competition with a sixth-minute free-kick. However, Madrid were soon back on level terms thanks to Zinedine Zidane's goal after 15 minutes before further goals from Christos Maladenis and Demis Nikolaidis put the hosts in the driving seat. However, another Zidane strike and a second-half Guti goal ensured Madrid left with a point. An in a way opposite match was played in Madrid where Steve McManaman's two goals put Real Madrid in front during half-time and AEK Athens equalised with goal by Kostas Katsouranis and Walter Centeno. The next match was against Racing Genk in Athens. Racing Genk scored first and AEK Athens responded with Vasilios Lakis scoring. The group stage was concluded in Rome against Roma where AEK Athens was once again behind in the scoreline by a goal scored by Marco Delvecchio but managed to score a late equaliser with Walter Centeno. The six draws AEK Athens secured are a feat no other club has ever accomplished.

The team continued in the UEFA Cup and smashed Israeli champions Maccabi Haifa by achieving two of their biggest wins ever in European competitions. They first won in Athens 4–0 with goals by Grigoris Georgatos, Demis Nikolaidis, Milen Petkov and Thodoris Zagorakis and then 4–1 in Nicosia with two goals by Vasilis Lakis and two more by Kostas Katsouranis and Dimitris Nalitzis. Walid Badir had earlier scored a penalty kick for Maccabi Haifa. AEK Athens' run was brought to an end in the last-16 round by Spanish side Málaga. They drew 0–0 in Málaga but lost 0–1 in Athens thanks to a goal by Manu.

The season was also punctuated by the demolition of Nikos Goumas Stadium, home to AEK for over 70 years and the assault of club president Makis Psomiadis and his bodyguards to the team captain Demis Nikolaidis.

2003–04 season

After seven years wearing AEK Athens' number 11 shirt during which he scored 125 goals in the Alpha Ethniki and partly due to the club's growing financial problems from mismanagement, Demis Nikolaidis terminated his contract by mutual consent and signed for Atlético Madrid. The transfers of Nikos Liberopoulos from Panathinaikos and Giannis Okkas from PAOK promised to revitalise the club's on-field success amid the growing financial problems.

Overview

Under Bajević's management the club generally perform well, especially in his first season. They played a total of 82 matches winning 45 of them and drawing in 23 more. They scored a total of 166 goals conceding 78.

The Ilie Dumitrescu Era (2004)

2003–04 season, Part II

Modest performances, though, were not enough as more off-field dramas unfolded. Unable to cope with the negativity from a large section of AEK Athens fans, Bajević resigned in 2004 during a season match against Iraklis and Ilie Dumitrescu was appointed as a caretaker manager.

AEK contributed vitally to Greece's triumph in UEFA Euro 2004. Five out of the total 24 players of the Greek squad came from AEK Athens' squad (Thodoris Zagorakis, Vasilis Tsiartas, Michalis Kapsis, Kostas Katsouranis, Vasilios Lakis). Two more former AEK players were present though they had left the club at the time (Traianos Dellas and Demis Nikolaidis).

Dellas and Zagorakis were voted in the UEFA Team of the Tournament. Zagorakis, who captained Greece, was also voted MVP of the tournament.

The Demis Nikolaidis Era (2004–2008)

The Fernando Santos Era, Part II (2004–2006)

Honours Won: —

Runner-up: Alpha Ethniki (2006), Greek Cup (2006)

2004–05 season

On the brink of bankruptcy and losing most of its UEFA Euro 2004 stars and experienced players to other European clubs, AEK needed a miracle to prevent it from being relegated to the Greek amateur leagues. Though both Kostas Katsouranis and Nikos Liberopoulos remained, Vasilios Borbokis, Grigoris Georgatos, UEFA Euro 2004 MVP Thodoris Zagorakis, Michalis Kapsis, Michalis Kasapis, Michel Kreek, Vasilios Lakis, Vasilios Tsiartas and Giannis Okkas all left the club in the wake of the troubles.

In was then when Demis Nikolaidis persuaded a group of businessmen (including Nikos Notias, Petros Pappas, Takis Kannelopoulos and Gikas Goumas) to buy shares and invest money to the club and became the new club president with the help of all AEK fans who started mass protests organized by the hardcore fans Original 21. His primary task was to lead AEK Athens out of its precarious financial position. The first success was an arrangement through the Greek justice system to write off most of the massive debt that previous club administrators had amassed and to repay any remaining public debts in manageable instalments. Securing the club's existence in the Alpha Ethniki, Nikolaidis then began a program to rebuild AEK to its former glory. He appointed experienced former player Ilija Ivić as technical director of the club and brought back Fernando Santos as head coach. The AEK Athens fans, emboldened by Nikolaidis's efforts, followed suit by buying season ticket packages in record numbers (over 17,000). AEK Athens recruited mostly young Greek players led by Katsouranis and Liberopoulos to form a competitive team. Santos also brought two players from his former club Porto on loan, Paulo Assunção and Bruno Alves both of whom were integral during the season.

With the winter additions of Júlio César, Serbian international Vladimir Ivić and Ilias Kyriakidis AEK Athens came close to winning the 2004–05 Alpha Ethniki but a surprise loss to underdogs Ionikos cost them the title. Furthermore, a serious mistake by referee Kyros Vassaras made them lose the chance to compte in the UEFA Champions League third qualifying round.

2005–06 season

The next season the club was strengthened with Greek internationals Vasilios Lakis and Traianos Dellas, Giorgos Alexopoulos, Stefano Sorrentino and Bruno Cirillo. A group of young talented Greek footballers including Sokratis Papastathopoulos, Panagiotis Kone and Vasilis Pliatsikas were also purchased. During the winter transfer period AEK Athens signed Emerson and Pantelis Kapetanos.

In the Alpha Ethniki AEK Athens finished second securing a place in the UEFA Champions League third qualifying round. The highlight was a 3–0 home win against Panathinaikos, with all tree goal scored in the last ten minutes by Nikos Liberopoulos, Louay Chanko and Vasilios Lakis.

In the Greek Cup AEK Athes reached the final for the seventh time in the last thirteen years surpassing PAS Giannina, Ethnikos Piraeus, Niki Volos and Agrotikos Asteras.

In the UEFA Cup first round AEK Athens were unfortunate enough to draw against Russian fourth placed side Zenit even though they were a seeded club. They managed to secure a 0–0 draw in Saint Petersburg but lost 0–1 in Athens due to an 89th-minute goal by Andrei Arshavin.

The Lorenzo Serra Ferrer Era (2006–2008)

Honours Won: —

Runner-up: Super League Greece (2007)

2006–07 season

President Demis Nikolaidis appointed former Real Betis manager Lorenzo Serra Ferrer as head coach so that AEK Athens could play a more attacking style of football.

Kostas Katsouranis was transferred to Benfica for €2.5M. Summer transfers included Greek internationals Panagiotis Lagos and Akis Zikos and the loan of Gustavo Manduca.

His season started well as AEK Athens easily overcame Hearts in the UEFA Champions League third qualifying round by beating them twice, thus qualifying to the group stage. In the group stage the club obtained 8 points, their top performance until then, beating Lille, 1–0 goal by Nikos Liberopoulos and Milan, 1–0 goal by Júlio César, in their way to the third place.

During the winter transfer period AEK Athens signed Greek international Pantelis Kafes.

In the Super League AEK Athens finished second securing a place in the 2007–08 UEFA Champions League third qualifying round.

2007–08 season, Part I

The season started with great expectations for AEK Athens as they signed Argentine international Rodolfo Arruabarrena, Brazilian football legend Rivaldo and Ismael Blanco. Gustavo Manduca's loan move was made permanent.

After two years together AEK Athens and Adidas went on separate ways and the kit sponsor switched to Puma.

For the 2007–08 UEFA Champions League third qualifying round AEK Athens were drawn with UEFA Cup and Copa del Rey holders, Sevilla and were easily eliminated losing both games. The second match was postponed due to the death of Antonio Puerta due to cardiac arrest and a moment of silence was held prior to the game. After being eliminated from the UEFA Champions League AEK Athens were drawn to play Austrian champions Red Bull Salzburg in the UEFA Cup. On 20 September in Athens, AEK Athens defeated Red Bull Salzburg 3–0. The second leg was played in Salzburg on 4 October AEK Athens lost the match but still went through 3–1 on agg. On 9 October AEK Athens were drawn in Group C in the UEFA Cup group stage along with Spanish fifth placed side Villarreal, Italian sixth placed side Fiorentina, Czech third placed side Mladá Boleslav and Swedish champions Elfsborg. On 25 October AEK Athens kicked off the group stage's with a 1–1 draw away to Elfsborg, on 29 November AEK Athens again drew 1–1, this time at home to Fiorentina. On 5 December AEK Athens won Mlada Boleslav 1–0 away and on 20 December although AEK Athens was home defeated 1–2 by Villarreal, finally booked a place in the knockout stage of the UEFA Cup, finishing third in the group.

The Greek Super League's opening season games were postponed by the EPO due to the 2007 Greek forest fires in the Peloponnese. Nevertheless, AEK Athens started with six straight wins without conceding a single goal until an unexpected home loss in the hands of Iraklis.

The Nikos Kostenoglou Era, Part I (2008)

Honours Won: —

Runner-up: Super League Greece (2008)

2007–08 season, Part II

On 12 February 2008 AEK parted company with Lorenzo Serra Ferrer after a poor run of form and un-successful signings and replaced him with former player and then assistant manager Nikos Kostenoglou, on a caretaker basis, at the end of an indifferent season.

The team had an impressive run in the last ten games of the league, during which they had two 4–0 wins against Olympiacos and PAOK, finishing in first place.

Nevertheless, the team ultimately finished second due to a court case between Apollon Kalamaria and Olympiacos for the illegal usage of Roman Wallner in Apollon Kalamaria's 1–0 win earlier in the season. Olympiacos were awarded the three points in a court hearing, thus finishing two points ahead of AEK. AEK president Demis Nikolaidis and several other managers and chairmen have been angered with the court's decision stating that the Hellenic Football Federation knew about the usage of the illegal player prior to the game but did not do anything about it.

The second place meant that the club had to compete in the league's play-offs but AEK Athens' captains, MVP performer Rivaldo and president Demis Nikolaidis did not want to compete as they considered themselves champions. Akis Zikos preferred to retire after the league's last game against Asteras Tripoli than compete in the play-offs. Nevertheless, the club's stakeholders insisted that the club had to compete and the ultimately did. The club's low morale resulted in disastrous results, including a 4–1 loss against Panathinaikos and a 4–0 loss against Aris. They finishing second in the play-offs missing the opportunity to compete in the UEFA Champions League during the nest season.

The Giorgos Donis Era (2008)

Honours Won: —

Runner-up: —

2008–09 season, Part I

Giorgos Donis, former head coach of 2006–07 Greek Cup winners, AEL, was appointed as head coach of AEK Athens. There were big changes in the squad with the club spending almost €8M in signings including Swedish international Daniel Majstorović, Nacho Scocco, Argentine international Sebastián Saja, Spanish international Juanfran, Greece's captain Angelos Basinas, Greek international Sotiris Kyrgiakos and Algerian international Rafik Djebbour and the simultaneous departure of all tree captains and club legends Akis Zikos, Traianos Dellas and Nikos Liberopoulos combined with young starlet Sokratis Papastathopoulos' transfer to Genoa. On top of that Brazilian legend Rivaldo who was the new captain asked and was ultimately given, a last minute transfer to Uzbeki side Bunyodkor.

The season started in the worst way possible as AEK Athens failed to surpass Omonia (0–1 in Athens, 2–2 in Nicosia) for the UEFA Cup's second qualifying round resulting in their elimination from European competitions, the earliest in their history.

The league campaign started very well due to the 2–1 derby win over rivals Panathinaikos thanks to goals by Edinho and Ismael Blanco in the opening game but a series of poor performances and results left AEK Athens in a difficult situation. Donis was eager to leave the club after drawing 3–3 against underdogs Thrasyvoulos despite having a 0–3 half-time lead, but president Demis Nikolaidis did not allow him to leave. Nevertheless, Nikolaidis left shortly after due to the continuous disappointing results, the heavy criticism he took from the fans and the press for the disbandment of last year's championship winning team and a lengthy clash with the club's hardcore supporters Original 21. The presidency was temporarily taken by Nikos Koulis and Takis Kanellopoulos. However, the series of disappointing results continued, bringing anger and insecure situations for everyone in the team. The first to be hit by this wave of disappointment and with the council of the team upset, was Donis, who was asked to leave the team after a 0–0 home draw against Panserraikos.

Financial struggle and relegation (2008–2013)

The Dušan Bajević Era, Part III (2008–2010)

Honours Won: —

Runner-up: Greek Cup: 1 (2009)

2008–09 season, Part II

On 21 November 2008, Koulis and Kanellopoulos hired Dušan Bajević as head coach for the third time. However, after a while and because of the controversy surrounding Bajević's return to AEK Athens a rivalry sparked between him and Kanellopoulos resulting in the latter's resign from the presidency.

Georgios Kintis became the team's new president shortly after but did not last long as on 4 February 2009 Nikos Thanopoulos was elected as number 41 president of AEK Athens.

During the winter transfer period Edson Ratinho and Greece's captain Angelos Basinas left the club. The only addition to the squad was Olivier N'Siabamfumu.

Bajevic brought some much-needed stability to the club and performances on the pitch improved vastly towards the end of the season, culminating in AEK's progression to the Greek Cup final against Olympiacos. Although they took an early 2–0 lead, thanks to two goals by Ismael Blanco and a 3–2 lead, thanks to a stoppage time goal by Nacho Scocco, the march ended in a 4–4 draw and the winner would be decided in a penalty shootout in which AEK Athens lost 14–15 due to three penalties misses by Daniel Majstorovic, Nikos Georgeas and Agustin Pelletieri.

AEK Athens finished fourth in the Greek Super League, thus qualifying for the seasons play-offs.

In the play-offs they secured the second place just missing out the UEFA Champions League third qualifying round ticket. Instead AEK Athens would compete in the newly founded UEFA Europa League.

Ismael Blanco finished the season with a total 23 goals, 14 of which were scored in the Greek Super League earning him his second consecutive title of Greek Super League top goalscorer. He was also the top goalscorer of the Greek Cup.

2009–10 season

During the summer transfer period AEK Athens signed mainly player from the Greek league including Kostas Manolas, Greek international Grigoris Makos and Leonardo. They also signed naturalized Polish international Roger.

The season started with a shocker due to the last minute 3 million Euros transfer of team captain Sotiris Kyrgiakos to Liverpool, the 2–1 loss to Romanian fifth placed side Vaslui for the first lef of the UEFA Europa League play-off round and Dušan Bajević's altercation with the club's all-time highest paid transfer Rafik Djebbour which resulted to the latter not training or playing with the rest of the squad. Despite the difficulties AEK Athens won 3–0 in the second leg, thanks to goals by Gustavo Manduca and Nacho Scocco (x2) and qualified for the UEFA Europa League group stage.

In a group featuring Portuguese third placed side Benfica, English fifth placed side Everton and Belarusian champions BATE, AEK Athens secured only a 1–0 victory against Benfica thanks to a header by Daniel Majstorovic and a gathered total of four points.

On top of that AEK Athens failed to progress from the Greek Cup fourth round as they lost 0–1 front to Beta Ethniki underdogs Thrasyvoulos.

In the Super League AEK Athens failed to impress with their most memorable moment being a 2–1 away victory against rivals Olympiacos thanks to two goals scored by Nacho Scocco. They finished fourth and qualified for the Super League play-offs.

In the Super League play-offs AEK Athens secured the second place and a UEFA Europa League play-off round ticket by beating Olympiacos 2–1 thanks to goals by Kostas Manolas and Ismael Blanco.

Ismael Blanco was the season's top scorer for the club bagging 13 goals while Gustavo Manduca and Nacho Scocco were the top assist men with 5 assists each.

2010–11 season, Part I

In the 2010 summer transfer period AEK Athens chose to sign more experienced players including Greek internationals and former AEK Athens captains Nikos Liberopoulos and Traianos Dellas, Greek international Christos Patsatzoglou and Senegal's 2002 FIFA World Cup hero Papa Bouba Diop.

AEK Athens had a very good pre-season easily winning the inaugural 2010 Sydney Festival of Football.

Just before the season started Dušan Bajević was attacked during a friendly match by fans due to him having signed for rival side Olympiacos in 1996.

AEK Athens qualified from the UEFA Europa League play-off round surpassing Scottish third placed side Dundee United. In the group stage they were drawn against Russia third placed side Zenit, Belgian champions Anderlecht and Croatian runner-up side Hajduk Split.

In the Greek Super League despite having a favourable schedule AEK Athens lost twice (against Kerkyra and Olympiakos Volou) and drew once (against Asteras Tripoli) in their four first matches.

Bajević resigned on 26 September 2010, after a 3–1 loss against Olympiakos Volou.

Bledar Kola was appointed as a caretaker manager.

The Manolo Jiménez Era, Part I (2010–2011)

Honours Won: Greek Cup: 1 (2011)

Runner-up: —

2010–11 season, Part II

On 9 October 2010 Manolo Jiménez agreed a two-year deal with AEK Athens.

Results were instantly improved and AEK Athens won both derby matches against Panathinaikos and Olympiacos by 1–0 and secured an impressive 0–4 away victory against Aris. They also beat PAOK 4–0 thanks to goals by Papa Bouba Diop, Ignacio Scocco (x2) and Traianos Dellas.

AEK Athens moved to a new training complex in Spata in November 2010. The complex was built using funds of AEK Athens shareholder Nikos Notias.

During the winter transfer period AEK Athens signed Moroccan international Nabil Baha and Croatian international Dino Drpić and loaned Míchel and David Mateos.

In the Greek Cup AEK Athens easily surpassed AEL with an 0–4 away victory thanks to goals by Ismael Blanco, Nikolaos Georgeas, Rafik Djebbour and Kostas Manolas. In the quarter-finals they faced rivals Panathinaikos. Two goals by Nikos Liberopoulos secured a 0–2 away victory which seemed to be enough to secure qualification. In the second leg Panagiotis Lagos scored first for AEK Athens but they went on to concede three goals. A last stoppage time goal thanks to a long-range free kick by Míchel gave AEK Athens a place in the semi-finals, where they would face PAOK. The first game was held in Athens and ended in a 0–0 draw with the woodwork coming to PAOK's rescue twice after powerful headers by Papa Bouba Diop. In Thessaloniki AEK Athens secured a 0–1 win and a place in the final thanks to a header by their captain Traianos Dellas. The final against Atromitos proved easy and thanks to goals by Nikos Liberopoulos, Nabil Baha and Pantelis Kafes they won 3–0, winning the Greek Cup.

In the Super League play–offs, AEK Athens made a good start with two home wins (against Olympiakos Volos and PAOK) and an away draw against Panathinaikos but lost all tree remaining matches finishing third.

2011–12 season, Part I

The transfer of Ignacio Scocco to Al Ain in the United Arab Emirates brought €2,800,000 to AEK Athens yet combined with the departure of Argentine international Sebastián Saja and Míchel greatly depowered the squad. Furthermore, Papa Bouba Diop had to leave the team as his wife experienced complications during her pregnancy. To compensate for these departures AEK Athens signed former Iceland's captain Eiður Guðjohnsen, José Carlos and Greek international Konstantopoulos. Additionally Steve Beleck and Cala were signed on one-year-long loan deals. They also completed the last minute signing of Colombian international Fabián Vargas.

In the UEFA Europa League play-off round AEK Athens were drawn against Georgian runner-up side Dinamo Tbilisi. In Athens AEK Athens won 1–0 thanks to a header by José Carlos. In Tbilisi Dinamo scored a first-minute goal thanks to their captain Aleksandre Koshkadze and led the match to extra time. During extra time AEK Athens managed to equalise thanks to a penalty won by Guðjohnsen and taken by Leonardo. In the Group Stage AEK Athens was drawn against Belgian third place side Anderlecht, Russia fifth placed side Lokomotiv Moscow and Austrian champions Sturm Graz.

The Greek Super League premier game for AEK Athens was postponed twice. First due to the Koriopolis match fixing scandal in Greek football and then due to prime minister George Papandreou's speech in the Thessaloniki International Fair.

On 5 October 2011 Manolo Jiménez's contract was mutually terminated following heavy defeats in the hands of Anderlecht and PAOK

The Nikos Kostenoglou Era, Part II (2011–12)

Honours Won: —

Runner-up: —

2011–12 season, Part II

On 6 October 2011, former player and manager Nikos Kostenoglou agreed to return to AEK's managerial position and signed a one and a half year deal.

The club was plagued by injuries, the most notable of which was the one of Eiður Guðjohnsen who was left out for six months.

Several youngsters, including Viktor Klonaridis, Mavroudis Bougaidis and Taxiarchis Fountas found their place in the club's starting eleven. Klonaridis in particular was crucial, scoring twice in derby matches with Panathinaikos

Despite the problems the club qualified for the Super League Greece play–offs and competed for the Champions League qualification slot but lost it in the last fixture against Panathinaikos protesting for a wrongly disallowed goal scored by captain Nikos Liberopoulos.

The Vaggelis Vlachos Era (2012)

Honours Won: —

Runner-up: —

2012–13 season, Part I

Owing to the growing financial problems the clubs was not allowed to participate in the 2012–13 UEFA Europa League as it failed to meet the requirement for a license. Furthermore, both of the club's captains, Traianos Dellas and Nikos Liberopoulos, decided to retire from professional football.

In the face of this crisis, AEK legend Thomas Mavros took over and appointed his former teammate and close friend Vangelis Vlachos as manager. Vasilis Tsiartas was appointed as director of football and Christos Kostis as the club's general captain.

The club's squad was severely weakened with the majority of last season's regular starters being sold (Viktor Klonaridis, Grigoris Makos and Leonardo) or released (Pantelis Kafes, Fabián Vargas, Nikolaos Georgeas, Kostas Manolas, Eiður Guðjohnsen and Nikolaos Karabelas).

Summer transfers were predominantly young Greek players. The most notable additions were Giorgos Katidis who had just captained Greece Under-19 to the final of the 2012 UEFA European Under-19 Football Championship, Emilio Furtado who was top scorer in the 2011–12 Football League and Miguel Ángel Cordero.

The club performed badly and was constantly in the relegation zone. As a result, and while the club was in the league's last position with just one point, Vlachos was sacked by Andreas Dimitrelos and was replaced by his assistant Manolis Papadopoulos. Mavros, who disagreed with the decision to replace the manager, decided to leave the club.

The Ewald Lienen Era (2012–2013)

Honours Won: —

Runner-up: —

2012–13 season, Part II

The winter transfer period was marked by the departure of two of the club's most experienced players, Panagiotis Lagos and Giannis Kontoes. Despite that, the additions of Antonis Petropoulos, Pavlos Mitropoulos and Tasos Tsoumagas helped the club improve its performance and rise from the relegation slots.

A tragic performance against PAS Giannina resulted in Ewald Lienen being sacked.

The second Melisannidis Era (2013–)

The Traianos Dellas Era (2013–2015)

Honours Won: Football League 2 (6th Group) (2014), Football League (South Division) (2015)

Runner-up: —

2012–13 season, Part III

AEK hired former player Traianos Dellas (played during 1999–2001, 2005–2008 and 2010–2012) as a manager in order to direct the club in it fight against relegation in the two decisive fixtures remaining. Two former players joined him in the coaching staff, Vasilios Borbokis (played during 1993–1997 and 2002–2003) and Akis Zikos (played during 1998–2002 and 2006–2008).  The club lost to Atromitos in the last fixture and was therefore relegated to Football League 2 on 21 April 2013.

 2013–14 Season

Businessman Dimitris Melissanidis became club owner at the summer of 2013 after the club had been relegated to the third tier of Greek Football.  The new owner presented the project of a new stadium for the club Hagia Sophia Stadium. AEK easily won promotion from Football League 2 with only one loss to their record.  However the team failed to win the Football League 2 Cup after being knocked out by Agrotikos Asteras 2–0 in extra time at the semi-finals.

 2014–15 Season 

In the 2014 Summer Transfer Window the team made various signings from Super League teams with the ones standing out being youngster Petros Mantalos from Xanthi, Christos Aravidis from Panionios and Helder Barbosa from Braga. The team powered through the league being unbeaten up until the play–off phase. The highlight of the season being the Quarter-Final of the Greek Cup against Olympiacos which AEK ultimately lost 4–1(agg) by a 90th-minute goal in the second leg at OAKA. The match was abandoned after fans attacked Olympiacos players shortly after the goal with the Olympiacos manager and players making offensive gestures at the AEK fans after the hosts protested that the goal was a handball. At the Football League play–offs the team lost their consistency and lost their unbeatable streak but nevertheless were promoted to the Greek Super League for the 2015–16 Season.

2015–16 season, Part I

Main Article:

The Gus Poyet Era (2015–2016)

Honours Won: —

Runner-up: —

2015–16 season, Part II

On 30 October 2015, Gus Poyet agreed a contract of 8 months + 2 years (if agreed) after the departure of Traianos Dellas on 20 October 2015 following a heavy loss (4–0) by Olympiacos. The team experienced radical changes over the summer. The major signings were: André Simões from Moreirense, Rodrigo Galo, Alain Baroja on a one-season loan with the option to buy at the end of it, from Caracas, Ronald Vargas, Dídac Vilà and Diego Buonanotte who hundreds of AEK fans greeted at the airport. The transfers also included the return of Rafik Djebbour after 4 years. The team, under Dellas won most friendlies and drew with Sevila and Inter Milan. The team won its first game back in the league 3–0 against Platanias. But, the team lost against PAOK at Toumba Stadium (2–1) and against Olympiacos away (4–0) and drew with Panathinaikos away (0–0). Despite those bad results in these derbies the team won almost every other match including a fierce 5–1 win against Iraklis. Gus Poyet managed to change the atmosphere in the club and despite having 1 point in his first 2 games (0–0 draw with Panathinaikos,0–1 loss to Asteras Tripolis at home) lead the club to an unbeaten streak spanning from the start of 2016 to February 2016. The team picked up an important 1–0 win against PAOK through Vargas' goal. The same man scored in the other 2 derbies in February, scoring against Olympiacos ending their unbeaten streak in the league, as well as scoring against Pananthinaikos through a well-taken free Kick. AEK also enjoyed a good Greek Cup campaign reaching the semi-final before Poyet was sacked on 19 April 2016 due to conflicts with club president Dimitris Melissanidis mainly focusing the club's ambitions and budget.

Stelios Manolas was appointed as interim head coach and managed AEK until the end of the season, qualifying for the Cup final against Olympiacos. Manolas and his men beat Olympiacos 2–1 for the second time within 3 months to lift AEK's 15th Cup Title. The same night, celebrations were organised by fans at Nea Filadelfeia who celebrated with the players and staff. At the league play–offs the team did not capitalise on their form in the Greek Cup and facing the fatigue that was built up, only managed a 3rd-place finish, thus qualifying for the 2016-17 UEFA Europa League in the 3rd qualifying round.

The Temur Ketsbaia Era (2016)

Honours Won: —

Runner-up: —

2016–17 season, Part I

During the summer of 2016, AEK appointed Temur Ketsbaia an ex-AEK Athens player and former Olympiacos FC manager. This season marked the club's return to European Competitions, facing AS Saint-Etienne in the 3rd qualifying round of the 2016-17 UEFA Europa League. The club signed experienced attacker Hugo Almeida as well as Patito Rodríguez, experienced English center-back Joleon Lescott, youngster goalkeeper Vasilis Barkas, Greek Internationals Lazaros Christodoulopoulos and Tasos Bakasetas and ex-Barcelona player Dmytro Chyhrynskyi. Also the club let go of Helder Barbosa a star player in their previous campaign. The team narrowly lost 1–0 (agg.) to AS Saint-Etienne and started the season off well with a 4–1 win over Xanthi with Hugo Almeida scoring a wondergoal. AEK's form after this match was poor and after another embarrassing loss away to Olympiacos, Temur Ketsbaia was sacked and replaced with José Morais.

The José Morais Era (2016–2017)

Honours Won: —

Runner-up: —

2016–17 season, Part II

The Manolo Jiménez Era, Part II (2017–2018)

Honours Won: Super League Greece: 1 (2018)

Runner-up: Super League Greece: 1 (2017), Greek Cup: 2 (2017, 2018)

2016–17 season, Part III

2017–18 season

The Marinos Ouzounidis Era (2018–2019)

Honours Won: —

Runner-up: —

2018–19 season, Part I

The Manolo Jiménez Era, Part III (2019)

Honours Won: —

Runner-up: Greek Cup: 1 (2019)

2018–19 season, Part II

The Miguel Cardoso Era (2019)

Honours Won: —

Runner-up: —

2019–20 season, Part I

The Nikos Kostenoglou Era, Part III (2019)

Honours Won: —

Runner-up: —

2019–20 season, Part II

Massimo Carrera Era (2019–2020)

Honours Won: —

Runner-up: Greek Cup: 1 (2020)

2019–20 season, Part III

2020–21 season, Part I

The Manolo Jiménez Era, Part IV (2020–2021)

Honours Won: —

Runner-up: —

2020–21 season, Part II

The Vladan Milojević Era (2021)

Honours Won: —

Runner-up: —

2021–22 season, Part I

The Argiris Giannikis Era (2021–2022)

Honours Won: —

Runner-up: —

2021–22 season, Part II

The Matías Almeyda Era (2022–)

Honours Won: —

Runner-up: —

2022–23 season

ETExtra time taken into account.
PENPenalty shout-out results taken into account.

Owner, chairman and manager history

CTServed as caretaker manager.

Kit

Crest and Colours

In 1924, AEK Athens adopted the image of a double-headed eagle as their emblem. AEK Athens was created by Greek refugees from Constantinople in the years following the Greco-Turkish War and subsequent population exchange and the emblem was chosen as a reminder of their lost homelands representing the club's historical ties to Constantinople. After all, the double-headed eagle is featured in the flag of the Greek Orthodox Church, whose headquarters are in Constantinople and served as Imperial emblem under the Palaiologos dynasty.

AEK Athens' main emblem underwent numerous minor changes between 1924 and 1982. The design of the eagle on the shirt badge was often not identical to the design of the eagle depicted on official club correspondence, merchandise and promotional material. All designs were considered "official" (in the broadest sense of the word), however, it was not until 1982 that an identifiable, copyrighted design was established as the club's official shirt and badge. The emblem design was changed in 1989 and again in 1993 to the current shield design.

Yellow and black, the colours AEK Athens has adopted for their kits come from it connection with Constantinople and the Byzantine Empire. Yellow symbolises the hope that the Greek refugees will once be able to return to their homes while black symbolises the grief for the loss of their homes. The colours are also featured in the flag of the Greek Orthodox Church.

The third kit is usually blue and white colour taken from the Greek flag. For a couple of season the third kit used to be dark scarlet, a colour which was featured in the Empire's flag.

AEK Athens have always worn predominantly striped or plain yellow shirts, black shorts and yellow or black socks. Variations mostly include all-black or all-yellow kits. The most notable exception were the kits manufactured by Italian firms Basic and Kappa which were used during the 1990s. They featured a double-headed eagle across the kit and the 1994 version was voted "Kit of the season" by UEFA.

Kit history

1990's

|

2000's

|

|

|

|

|

|

|

|

2010's

|

|

|

|

|

|

|

|

|

|

2020's

|

|

|

|

Alternate coloured kits

|

|

|

|

|

|

|

|

|

|

|

|

|

|

|

|

1Kit was designed to honour Mimis Papaioannou who was named Greek player of the 20th century

Kit sponsors and manufacturers

Stadiums

AEK's traditional home venue had been the Nikos Goumas Stadium located in Nea Filadelfeia and built in 1930.

Since its proprietary stadium was demolished in 2003, AEK has been using the Athens Olympic Stadium. This stadium had also been briefly used in the mid '80s.

For limited periods of time or certain games other venues have housed AEK, including Apostolos Nikolaidis Stadium, Nea Smyrni Stadium, Yiannis Pathiakakis Stadium, Karaiskakis Stadium and Georgios Kamaras Stadium

Training Facilities

AEK Athens has been using an old training complex in Thrakomakedones for years.

AEK Athens moved to a new training complex in Spata in November 2010. The complex was built using funds of AEK Athens shareholder Nikos Notias. There are currently two regular pitches with two more planned for the future. The main building hosts amongst many others the team's offices, a press room and the players rooms.

Youth academy

AEK was the first Greek club to found a youth academy back in 1934.

Famous players have been produced by AEK youth development system over the years.

Some of the most notable include: Tryfon Tzanetis (1933–1950), Kleanthis Maropoulos (1934–1952), Andreas Stamatiadis (1950–1969), Stelios Skevofilakas (1960–1973), Nikos Karoulias (1973–1974), Stelios Manolas (1978–1998), Spyros Ikonomopoulos (1977–1996), Vangelis Vlachos (1979–1985), Lysandros Georgamlis (1979–1985), Pantelis Konstantinidis (1993–1994), Dionysis Chiotis (1994–2007), Sokratis Papastathopoulos (2005–2008), Savvas Gentsoglou (2006–2012), Panagiotis Tachtsidis (2007–2010), Kostas Manolas (2009–2012), Victor Klonaridis (2010–2012, 2017–2020) and Konstantinos Galanopoulos (2015–).

One-Club Men

Notable former players

List contains players with more than 200 league appearances and / or more than 50 league goals.

Men in multiple positions

Transfer records

Top arrivals

Top departures

Competition timeline

History of squad numbers

Regular squad numbers did not exist before the 1997–98 season.

Seasons overview

Players sorted according to the time they have spent in the club.
W:Arrived during the winter transfer period.
Players in Italics left during the season.
*After Play–offs.

See also
AEK Athens F.C.
List of AEK Athens F.C. records and statistics
AEK Athens F.C. in European football

References

External links
AEK Athens History on aekfc.gr

AEK Athens F.C.